Tatipudi is a village  in Wyra mandal, Khammam district, in Telangana, India.Tatipadu village is small village and it is handover under TS government in year 2014 and central government,it has no development from ages .There are total population 3589 members and it is famous for tamrind

References 

Villages in Khammam district